George Clayton Abel GM was a Flight Lieutenant in the Royal Canadian Air Force during World War II. In 1944, he was awarded the George Medal. The citation read:

References 

Royal Canadian Air Force personnel of World War II
Recipients of the George Medal
Date of birth missing
Date of death missing
Royal Canadian Air Force officers